The 2015 Copa do Brasil Finals were the two-legged final that decided the winner of the 2015 Copa do Brasil, the 27th edition of the Copa do Brasil, Brazil's national cup football tournament organized by CBF.

The finals were contested in two-legged home-and-away format between Santos and Palmeiras, two of the most successful clubs of Brazil. Following a draw to determine the home and away teams for both legs, Santos hosted the first match at Vila Belmiro in Santos on 25 November 2015, while the second match was hosted by Palmeiras at Allianz Parque in São Paulo on 2 December 2015.

Santos won the first leg by 1–0, and Palmeiras won the second leg by 2–1. As the tournament does not include extra time for any match in case of a tied aggregate score, nor even the away goals rule for the finals, the second match went straight to the penalty shoot-out, which Palmeiras won by 4–3 to claim their 3rd Copa do Brasil title.

This was the first Copa do Brasil win for manager Marcelo Oliveira, having reached the finals four times as he was runners-up in 2011, 2012 and 2014. The title was also Palmeiras' first playing in Allianz Parque, inaugurated in November 2014.

As winners, Palmeiras qualified automatically to group stage of the 2016 Copa Libertadores de América.

Qualified teams

Road to the finals
Note: In all results below, the score of the finalist is given first (H: home; A: away).

Match details

First leg

Second leg

See also
2015 Campeonato Brasileiro Série A

References

External links

Finals
2015
Sociedade Esportiva Palmeiras matches
Santos FC matches
Association football penalty shoot-outs
November 2015 sports events in South America